Barański (feminine: Barańska; plural: Barańscy) is a Polish surname. It is related to the following surnames:

People
 Agata Barańska (born 1993), Polish tennis player
 Andrzej Barański (born 1941), Polish film director
 Anna Barańska (born 1984), Polish volleyball player
 Anna Barańska (born 1976), Polish mountaineer
 Celeste Baranski (born 1957), American electronic engineer, entrepreneur, and executive 
 Christine Baranski (born 1952), American actress
 Feliks Barański (1915–2006), Polish mathematician
 Jadwiga Barańska (born 1935), Polish actress
 Nikolay Baransky (1881–1963) Soviet economic geographer
 Renata Baranski (born 1965), Polish-American tennis player
 Tibor Baranski (1922–2019), Hungarian-American Righteous Among the Nations

Polish-language surnames